T Street may refer to:

T-Street, a beach in San Clemente, California
T-Streets, an artist signed to Young Money Entertainment record label
T-Street Productions, an American film and television production company

See also
Search for